Placenta is a peer-reviewed medical journal in the field of obstetrics and gynecology. It provides information on scientific and clinical investigations pertaining to placental research and their applications. The journal includes full length and mini reviews, original articles, book reviews, announcements and reports, abstracts of important meetings, and letters to the editor.

It is the official journal of the International Federation of Placenta Associations, which incorporates:

 Australia and New Zealand Placenta Research Association
 European Placenta Group
 Japanese Placenta Association
 the Placenta Association of the Americas

References

External links 
 

Monthly journals
Elsevier academic journals
English-language journals
Publications established in 1980
Obstetrics and gynaecology journals